Andriy Rabiy  (born October 1, 1975) is an American bishop of the Ukrainian Greek Catholic Church and serves as auxiliary bishop for the Ukrainian Catholic Archeparchy of Winnipeg.

Biography
On December 19, 2001, Rabiy was ordained to the priesthood. Pope Francis appointed Rabiy  auxiliary bishop for the Ukrainian Catholic Archeparchy of Philadelphia on August 8, 2017.  On September 3, 2017, Rabiy was consecrated as a bishop.  On September 24, 2017, Rabiy was installed as auxiliary bishop. On April 16, 2018, Rabiy was named Apostolic Administrator of Philadelphia when Archeparch Stefan Soroka's resignation was accepted by Pope Francis.  

On November 10, 2022, Pope Francis appointed Rabiy as auxiliary bishop for the Ukrainian Catholic Archeparchy of Winnipeg.  His welcoming occurred on December 30, 2022.

See also
 

 Catholic Church hierarchy
 Catholic Church in the United States
 Historical list of the Catholic bishops of the United States
 List of Catholic bishops of the United States
 Lists of patriarchs, archbishops, and bishops

References

External links

Ukrainian Catholic Archeparchy of Winnipeg Official Site
Ukrainian Catholic Archeparchy of Philadelphia Official Site

Episcopal succession

1975 births
Living people
Clergy from Lviv
Bishops of the Ukrainian Greek Catholic Church
American Eastern Catholic bishops
21st-century Eastern Catholic bishops
Bishops appointed by Pope Francis